Mickey's Orphans is a 1931 American animated short film produced by Walt Disney Productions and released by Columbia Pictures. The cartoon takes place during Christmas time and stars Mickey Mouse, Minnie Mouse, and Pluto, who take in a group of disruptive and mischievous kittens. It is directed by Burt Gillett and features the voices of Walt Disney as Mickey and Marcellite Garner as Minnie. It was the 36th Mickey Mouse film, the twelfth of that year.

The film was nominated for the Academy Award for Best Animated Short Film at the 5th Academy Awards in 1932, the award's inaugural year. It lost to another Disney film, Flowers and Trees, Disney's first color film.

Mickey's Orphans is a remake of the 1927 Oswald the Lucky Rabbit cartoon Empty Socks, the oldest Disney cartoon with a Christmas theme. The latter was considered lost, but an almost complete copy, missing about one minute, was found in The National Library of Norway in December 2014.

Plot
A hooded figure walks past a church on a snowy night carrying a covered basket. The Christmas carol "Silent Night" is heard coming from the church, setting the time of year. The figure then approaches Mickey Mouse's house and peeks in the window: Minnie is playing "Silent Night" on an organ, Mickey is decorating a Christmas tree, and Pluto is peacefully sleeping by the fire. The figure then leaves the basket on Mickey's doorstep, rings the bell, and walks away.

Pluto carries the basket inside and discovers it is loaded with kittens, evidently orphaned. Mickey and Minnie are at first charmed by the kittens, but the kittens soon prove to be a nuisance. Nevertheless, Mickey and Minnie are determined to make the kittens welcome. Mickey leaves the room momentarily and soon returns dressed as Santa Claus with a bag full of toys. The kittens remove the contents, the majority of which are various implements of destruction, such as saws, hammers, and toy weapons. The kittens go to work and destroy the piano and other furniture. Finally, Mickey and Minnie reveal their Christmas tree, but the kittens remove all the decorations and foliage.

Voice cast
 Mickey Mouse: Walt Disney
 Minnie Mouse: Marcellite Garner
 Pluto: Pinto Colvig
 Orphan Kittens: Marcellite Garner

Reception
Motion Picture Herald (December 19, 1931): "Minnie and Mickey find a basket on the doorstep on Christmas Eve. Out jump innumerable miniature Mickies, who proceed to take the furniture apart with neatness and dispatch, to the tune of usual animated furniture music. When Mickey and Minnie expose the Christmas tree, the animated infants strip it with no loss of time. The youngsters will get a real kick out of this short, and the oldsters will extract a bit of enjoyment."
This incorrectly refers to the kittens as smaller versions of Mickey.

The Film Daily (December 20, 1931): "Swell Holiday Cartoon: A Walt Disney Mickey Mouse production designed as a Christmas short and one that fills the bill. It will delight all children and get many a laugh from their elders... A Mickey Mouse short that is filled with many hilarious moments for children, and fun for adults who have ever staged a Christmas party for the youngsters."

Releases
1931 – Original theatrical release
1997 – Ink & Paint Club, episode #1.2 "Mickey's Landmarks" (TV)

Home media
The short was released on December 2, 2002 on Walt Disney Treasures: Mickey Mouse in Black and White.

Additional releases include:
1983 – "Cartoon Classics: Volume 5: Disney's Best of 1931-1948" (VHS)
2005 – "Vintage Mickey" (DVD)

See also
Mickey Mouse (film series)
 List of Christmas films

References

External links

Mickey's Orphans at the Disney Film Project
Mickey's Orphans at Animated Toast
Mickey's Orphans at Mickey Mouse Follies
 

1931 films
1931 animated films
Mickey Mouse short films
Pluto (Disney) short films
1930s Disney animated short films
American Christmas films
Animated films about cats
Animated films about mice
Animated films about orphans
Films directed by Burt Gillett
Films produced by Walt Disney
Disney film remakes
Short film remakes
American black-and-white films
Columbia Pictures short films
Columbia Pictures animated short films
1930s Christmas films
1930s American films